Amilly ( or ) is a commune and town in the Loiret department in north-central France.

Population

Sights
 Church of St. Martin (16th century)
 Castles of Varenne (16th century) and of the Bourgoins (18th century)
 Bardin Watermill
 Museum of Folk Art

Twin towns

  Nordwalde, Germany
  Vilanova del Camí, Spain
  Calcinaia, Italy

References

External links

 www.amilly.com Official site

Communes of Loiret